Japanese lily is a common name for several plants and may refer to:

 Rohdea japonica
 Lilium speciosum, native to southern Japan and southern China